National Highway 369 (NH 369) is a  national highway in India.

References

National highways in India
National Highways in Karnataka